Conrad Dubai in the United Arab Emirates is a 51-storey luxury hotel.  Located in Dubai's commercial center on Sheikh Zayed Road, the property is 2-minute walk from Dubai World Trade Centre and is close to Dubai International Financial Centre and The Dubai Mall.
The hotel was officially opened on 18 September 2013.

Conrad Dubai hotel has three food and beverage venues: Ballaro, Bliss 6, Cave, Isla and Kimpo.

See also 
 Hotels in Dubai
 Hilton Hotels & Resorts
 Conrad Hotels

References

 "This Hotel Pool Is the Latest Thing to Catch Our Attention in Dubai". Condé Nast Traveler. 17 October 2013.

External links
 Official website

Hotels in Dubai
Hilton Worldwide
Hotels established in 2013
Hotel buildings completed in 2013